Zdeněk Liška (16 March 1922 – 13 August 1983) was a Czech composer who produced a large number of film scores across a prolific career that started in the 1950s.  He was revelatory in his contribution to the development of electronic music. His music in this field is noticeable and dramatic, based on a unique musical feeling achieved through using quite unusual instrumental combinations and various electronic and electroacoustic techniques.

Biography 

Zdeněk Liška was born on 16 March 1922 in Smečno near Kladno in central Bohemia. His father and grandfather were amateur municipal musicians. As a child he learned to play the accordion and the violin; while in high school, he composed his first song.

He studied composition and conducting at Prague Conservatory under Rudolf Karel, Otakar Šín, Metod Doležil, and Karel Janeček. He graduated from the Conservatory in 1944. After a brief stint as a conductor of an amateur orchestra in Slaný and as a teacher at a Humpolec music school, he joined the Zlín Film Studios in 1945.

Works 

Liška worked notably with animator Jan Švankmajer, scoring several of his earlier short films: Punch and Judy (1966), Et Cetera (1966), Historia Naturae (Suita) (1967), The Flat (1968), Don Juan (1969), The Ossuary (1970), Jabberwocky (1971), and Leonardo's Diary (1972), and later The Castle of Otranto (1979).  Liška's music for Švankmajer's Historia Naturae (Suita), The Flat, and The Ossuary was also featured in the 1984 short film by American animators the Brothers Quay entitled The Cabinet of Jan Švankmajer.

He also created a great number of iconic scores for important live-action films of the Czech New Wave including The Shop on Main Street, Marketa Lazarová, The Valley of the Bees, Fruit of Paradise, The Cremator and Ikarie XB-1.

Liska was the most sought after film composer in Czechoslovakia in the 1950s and 1960s. He scored eight films a year plus numerous shorts, during the 1960s.

In addition to his feature-film work, Liška wrote music for the travel documentary films of Hanzelka and Zikmund, for Laterna Magika, for twelve of Karel Zeman's Mr. Prokouk films, and for various popular science short films. The main theme he wrote for the heavily propagandist television series Thirty Cases of Major Zeman is still widely remembered in the Czech Republic, where it is often played by rock bands.

In the mid-twentieth century, he was among the most well-known Czech film composers and the foremost Czech composer of fantasy film scores. He was noted for his skill with musical characterizations and humor in music, as well as his creative use of electronic music techniques. He lived in the era of film symphonies but he loved experimenting too with popular rock music and electronic instruments. His score for Death Is Called Engelchen won a prize in a competition for the best Czechoslovak feature-length film score of 1963.

Selected filmography

References

External links

Filmography at the České filmové nebe 
Zdeněk Liška at the last.fm webpages
Zdeněk Liška at the dmtls Merzbau
Facebook group for fans of Liška

1922 births
1983 deaths
People from Smečno
Czech composers
Czech male composers
Czech film score composers
20th-century composers
Male film score composers
20th-century Czech male musicians
Czechoslovak musicians
Electronic musicians